The auricular branch of occipital artery supplies the back of the concha and frequently gives off a branch, which enters the skull through the mastoid foramen and supplies the dura mater, the diploë, and the mastoid cells; this latter branch sometimes arises from the occipital artery, and is then known as the mastoid branch.

References

Arteries of the head and neck